Max von Sydow (born Carl Adolf von Sydow; 10 April 1929 – 8 March 2020) was a Swedish-French actor. He had a 70-year career in European and American cinema, television, and theatre, appearing in more than 150 films and several television series in multiple languages. He became a French citizen in 2002 and lived in France for the last two decades of his life.

Capable in roles ranging from stolid, contemplative protagonists to sardonic artists and menacing, often gleeful villains, von Sydow was first noticed internationally for playing the 14th-century knight Antonius Block in Ingmar Bergman's The Seventh Seal (1957), which features iconic scenes of his character challenging Death to a game of chess. He appeared in a total of eleven films directed by Bergman, among which were The Virgin Spring (1960) and Through a Glass Darkly (1961), both winners of the Academy Award for Best Foreign Language Film. He starred in a third winner, Bille August's Pelle the Conqueror (1987), a quarter-century later.

Von Sydow made his American film debut as Jesus Christ in George Stevens' Biblical epic film The Greatest Story Ever Told (1965) and went on to star in films such as William Friedkin's The Exorcist (1973), Sydney Pollack's Three Days of the Condor (1975), the science fiction film Flash Gordon (1980), the James Bond adaptation Never Say Never Again (1983), David Lynch's Dune (1984), Woody Allen's Hannah and Her Sisters (1986), Steven Spielberg's Minority Report (2002), Martin Scorsese's Shutter Island (2010), Ridley Scott's Robin Hood (2010), and J. J. Abrams' Star Wars: The Force Awakens (2015). He also had a supporting role in HBO's Game of Thrones as the Three-eyed Raven, for which he received a Primetime Emmy Award nomination.

During his career, von Sydow received two Academy Award nominations for his performances in Pelle the Conqueror (1987) and Extremely Loud & Incredibly Close (2011). He received the Royal Foundation of Sweden's Cultural Award in 1954, was made a Commandeur des Arts et des Lettres in 2005, and was named a Chevalier de la Légion d'honneur on 17 October 2012.

Early life
Carl Adolf von Sydow was born on 10 April 1929 in Lund, Sweden. His father, Carl Wilhelm von Sydow, was an ethnologist and professor of folkloristics at Lund University. His mother, Baroness Maria Margareta Rappe, was a schoolteacher. Von Sydow was of part-German ancestry. A paternal ancestor, David Sydow ("von" or "Von" was added later to the family surname), emigrated from Pomerania to the Kalmar region in 1724. His mother was also of part-Pomeranian descent. Von Sydow was raised as a Lutheran, but became an agnostic in the 1970s.

Von Sydow attended Lund Cathedral School, where he learned English at an early age. Originally expected to pursue a career in law, he became interested in acting after seeing a production of A Midsummer Night's Dream during a class trip to Malmö, which prompted him to establish an amateur theatrical group along with his friends back at school.

Von Sydow served for two years in the Swedish Army with the Army Quartermaster Corps, where he adopted the name "Max" from the star performer of a flea circus he saw. After completing his service, von Sydow studied at the Royal Dramatic Theatre (Dramaten) in Stockholm where he trained between 1948 and 1951. During his time at the Dramaten, he helped start a theatre group, of which actress Ingrid Thulin was a member. He made his stage debut in a small part in the Goethe play Egmont, which he considered "almost a disaster," but received good reviews for his performance.

Career

Early career

In 1951, von Sydow joined the Norrköping-Linköping Municipal Theatre, appearing in nine plays including Peer Gynt. In 1953, he moved on to the City Theatre in Hälsingborg, playing eleven parts in a two-year stint, including Prospero in The Tempest and the titular role of the Pirandello play Henry IV. Von Sydow's theatrical work won him critical recognition, and in 1954 he received the Royal Foundation of Sweden's Cultural Award, a grant to young, promising actors.

1955–1960s
In 1955, von Sydow moved to Malmö and joined the Malmö City Theatre, whose chief director at the time was Ingmar Bergman. Von Sydow had previously sought to play a small part in Bergman's Prison (1949), but the director rejected the proposition. Bergman and von Sydow's first film was The Seventh Seal (1957), in which von Sydow portrayed Antonius Block, a disillusioned 14th-century knight returning from the Crusades to a plague-stricken Sweden. The scene of his character playing a game of chess with Death has come to be regarded as an iconic moment in cinema. Von Sydow went on to appear in a total of 11 Bergman films. In The Magician (1958), von Sydow starred as Vogler, a 19th-century traveling illusionist who remains silent for most of the film. In The Virgin Spring (1960), he played a medieval landowner who plots vengeance on the men who raped and murdered his daughter. In Through a Glass Darkly (1961), he portrayed the husband of a schizophrenic woman, played by Harriet Andersson. During this period, he also had roles in films including Wild Strawberries (1957), Brink of Life (1958) and Winter Light (1963). Films starring von Sydow were submitted by Sweden for the Academy Award for Best Foreign Language Film in five out of six years between 1957 and 1962. Under Bergman, von Sydow also continued his stage career, playing Brick in Cat on a Hot Tin Roof, Peer in Peer Gynt, Alceste in The Misanthrope and Faust in Urfaust. In his company were Gunnar Björnstrand, Ingrid Thulin, Bibi Andersson and Gunnel Lindblom, all frequent collaborators of Bergman on screen.

Despite his rising profile, von Sydow limited his work exclusively to Sweden early in his career, constantly refusing offers to work outside the country. He was first approached at the 1959 Cannes Film Festival to act in U.S. films, but refused the proposition, saying that he was "content in Sweden" and "had no intention of starting an international career". He also refused the opportunity to play the titular role for Dr. No (1962) and Captain von Trapp in The Sound of Music (1965). In 1965, von Sydow finally accepted George Stevens's offer and made his international debut, playing Christ in the epic The Greatest Story Ever Told. He accepted the part against the advice of Bergman, spent six months at the University of California, Los Angeles, preparing for the role, and adopted a Mid-Atlantic accent. The film introduced von Sydow to a wider audience, but ultimately performed below expectations at the box office. He went on to play a crop-dusting pilot in The Reward (1965) and a fanatic missionary in Hawaii (1966). For his performance in Hawaii, von Sydow received his first Golden Globe nomination. To his own frustration, however, von Sydow would become frequently cast in villainous roles, such as a neo-Nazi aristocrat in The Quiller Memorandum (1966), a Russian colonel in The Kremlin Letter (1970), a meticulous and elegant international assassin in Three Days of the Condor (1975), Emperor Ming the Merciless in Flash Gordon (1980) and James Bond's nemesis Ernst Stavro Blofeld in Never Say Never Again (1983).

In the late 1960s and early 1970s, von Sydow was often paired with Liv Ullmann in Bergman films. In 1968's Hour of the Wolf, von Sydow played an artist living on an isolated island with his pregnant wife, played by Ullmann. In the same year, the two appeared in the drama Shame, about a couple (both former musicians) living on a farm on an island during a war. Von Sydow and Ullmann returned for the 1969 Bergman film The Passion of Anna. In 1971 and 1972, von Sydow again starred alongside Ullmann in the Jan Troell epic duology, The Emigrants The New Land, the story of a Swedish peasant family that emigrates to America in the mid-19th century.

1970s–1980s
In 1971, von Sydow starred in The Touch, Bergman's first English-language film, playing a doctor whose wife is having an affair. In 1973, von Sydow appeared in one of his most commercially successful films, William Friedkin's The Exorcist (1973). He played Father Lankester Merrin, the film's titular Jesuit priest, which earned him his second Golden Globe nomination. He reprised the role in the film's sequel, Exorcist II: The Heretic (1977). In 1977, von Sydow made his Broadway debut alongside Eileen Atkins and Bibi Andersson in Per Olov Enquist's The Night of the Tribades, a play about the writer August Strindberg. In 1981, he starred with Anne Bancroft in the Tom Kempinski play Duet for One about the cellist Jacqueline du Pré. Von Sydow made his British stage debut at The Old Vic in 1988 as Prospero in The Tempest, a role he first played in Sweden three decades ago.

In the 1980s, in addition to Flash Gordon and Never Say Never Again, von Sydow appeared in John Milius's Conan the Barbarian (1982), Jan Troell's Flight of the Eagle (1982), Rick Moranis's & Dave Thomas's Strange Brew (1983), David Lynch's Dune (1984) and Woody Allen's Hannah and Her Sisters (1986). In 1985, von Sydow was a member of the jury at the 35th Berlin International Film Festival. In the 1987 Bille August film Pelle the Conqueror, von Sydow portrayed an impoverished Swedish labourer who brought his son to Denmark to try to build a better life for themselves. The role won him international acclaim and is often considered one of the best roles in his career. For his performance, von Sydow received a Best Actor nomination at the 61st Academy Awards; the film won Best Foreign Language Film as Denmark's official Oscar entry. In 1988, von Sydow made his only directorial foray with Katinka, a film based on the Herman Bang novel, Ved Vejen. The film won the Guldbagge Awards for Best Film and Best Director, but was not widely seen outside Sweden. In 1989, von Sydow appeared in the television film Red King, White Knight, for which he received his first Primetime Emmy Award nomination. He also supplied the voice for Vigo  the Carpathian in the 1989 film, Ghostbusters II.

1990s–2000s

Von Sydow and Bergman did not work together for an extended period. A part in Bergman's Fanny and Alexander (1982) was specifically written for von Sydow, but his agent demanded too large a salary. Von Sydow came to regret missing out on the role. The two did eventually reunite in 1991 with The Best Intentions, directed by Bille August with a script from Bergman. In 1996, von Sydow made his final appearance in a Bergman film, Private Confessions, directed by Liv Ullmann and written by Bergman. In 1997, von Sydow played Nobel Prize-winning Norwegian novelist and Nazi sympathizer Knut Hamsun in the biopic Hamsun. Throughout the rest of the 1990s, von Sydow also appeared in films such as Father (1990), Awakenings (1990), Until the End of the World (1991), Needful Things (1993), Judge Dredd (1995) and Snow Falling on Cedars (1999). For his performance in Father, von Sydow won the Australian Film Institute Best Actor Award.

In 2002, von Sydow acted in one of his biggest commercial successes, playing the PreCrime director opposite Tom Cruise in Steven Spielberg's science fiction thriller Minority Report. In 2004, von Sydow appeared in a television adaptation of the Ring of the Nibelung saga. The show set ratings records and was later released in the United States as Dark Kingdom: The Dragon King. In 2007, he starred in the box-office hit Rush Hour 3 as one of the antagonists opposite Jackie Chan and Chris Tucker, and played the father of the protagonist in The Diving Bell and the Butterfly, Julian Schnabel's adaptation of the memoir by Jean-Dominique Bauby. In 2009, von Sydow appeared in the drama series The Tudors.

2010s

In 2010, von Sydow played a sinister German doctor in Martin Scorsese's Shutter Island, and Robin Hood's blind stepfather Sir Walter Loxley in Ridley Scott's Robin Hood. He received his second Academy Award nomination for his performance as a mute elderly renter in Stephen Daldry's Extremely Loud & Incredibly Close (2011), based on the novel by Jonathan Safran Foer.

In April 2013, von Sydow was honored at the Turner Classic Movie (TCM) Festival in Hollywood, with screenings of two of his classic films, Three Days of the Condor and The Seventh Seal.

In March 2014, Von Sydow provided the voice of an art forger named in The War of Art episode of The Simpsons.  

In 2015, he played the explorer Lor San Tekka in Star Wars: The Force Awakens. In 2016, he joined the HBO series Game of Thrones as the Three-eyed Raven. For his performance, von Sydow received his second Primetime Emmy Award nomination.

In addition to his film and television work, von Sydow also made forays into video games. He voiced Esbern, a mentor of the protagonist in The Elder Scrolls V: Skyrim (2011), and narrated the game's debut trailer. He also lent his voice to the 2009 game Ghostbusters: The Video Game and reprised his role as Lor San Tekka in Lego Star Wars: The Force Awakens (2016).

In 2018, von Sydow appeared in Thomas Vinterberg's film Kursk, also known as The Command, based on the true story of the Kursk submarine disaster. 

His final role was in Nicholas Dimitropoulos' war drama Echoes of the Past (2021). He portrayed Nicolas Andreou, one of the last living survivors of the Kalavryta massacre of 1943 committed by Nazi troops during the Axis occupation of Greece.

Personal life and death
Von Sydow married actress Christina Inga Britta Olin in 1951. They had two sons, Clas and Henrik, who appeared with him in the film Hawaii. The couple divorced in 1979. Von Sydow married French documentarian Catherine Brelet in 1997 and adopted Brelet's two sons, Cédric and Yvan, from her previous marriage.

Von Sydow relocated to Paris following his marriage to Brelet. In 2002, he became a citizen of France, at which time he had to relinquish his Swedish citizenship.

Von Sydow was reported to be either an agnostic or an atheist. In 2012, he told Charlie Rose in an interview that Ingmar Bergman had told him he would contact him after death to show him that there was a life after death. When Rose asked von Sydow if he had heard from Bergman, he replied that he had but chose not to elaborate further on the exact meaning of this statement. In the same interview, he described himself as a doubter in his youth but stated this doubt was gone and indicated he came to agree with Bergman's belief in the afterlife.

Von Sydow died on 8 March 2020 at his home in Provence, France at age 90. He was survived by his wife and his four sons.

Filmography

Awards and nominations 

He has been nominated for two Academy Awards for his performances in Bille August's Pelle the Conqueror (1987) and  Stephen Daldry's Extremely Loud & Incredibly Close (2011). At the age of 82, von Sydow was one of the oldest nominees for an Academy Award. Sydow also received two Golden Globe Awards nominations as well as two Primetime Emmy Awards nominations. In 1982 he received the Best Actor prize at the Venice International Film Festival for his performance in Flight of the Eagle. He is also the winner of 3 Guldbagge Awards and received a festival trophy from the Cannes Film Festival in 2004.

See also 
 List of actors with two or more Academy Award nominations in acting categories
 List of oldest and youngest Academy Award winners and nominees
 List of Academy Award records – first Nordic actor to be nominated for acting, for Pelle the Conqueror (1988)
 List of actors nominated for Academy Awards for non-English performances

Notes

References

External links

 

 
1929 births
2020 deaths
20th-century Swedish male actors
21st-century French male actors
21st-century Swedish male actors
Best Actor AACTA Award winners
Best Actor Bodil Award winners
Best Actor Guldbagge Award winners
Best Actor Robert Award winners
Best Director Guldbagge Award winners
Chevaliers of the Légion d'honneur
European Film Award for Best Actor winners
Former Lutherans
French expatriate male actors in the United States
French male film actors
French male television actors
French male video game actors
French male voice actors
French people of German descent
Naturalized citizens of France
People from Lund
People from Provence
Swedish agnostics
Swedish Army soldiers
Swedish emigrants to France
Swedish expatriate male actors in the United States
Swedish expatriates in Spain
Swedish male film actors
Swedish male stage actors
Swedish male television actors
Swedish male voice actors
Swedish nobility
Swedish people of German descent